Saray Mohammad Hoseyn (also Romanized as Sarāy Moḩammad Ḩoseyn and Sarā Moḩammad Ḩoseyn) is a village in Khormarud-e Jonubi Rural District, Cheshmeh Saran District, Azadshahr County, Golestan Province, Iran. At the 2006 census, its population was 302, in 74 families.

References 

Populated places in Azadshahr County